"Love Can't Ever Get Better Than This" is a song written by Nancy Montgomery and Irene Kelley, and recorded by American country music artists Ricky Skaggs and Sharon White.  It was released in April 1987 as the third single from the album Love's Gonna Get Ya!.  The song reached #10 on the Billboard Hot Country Singles chart.

Chart performance

References

1987 singles
Ricky Skaggs songs
Epic Records singles
1986 songs
Song recordings produced by Ricky Skaggs
Songs written by Irene Kelley